Valentina Peychinova (born 24 April 1977) is a Bulgarian biathlete. She competed in the women's relay event at the 1998 Winter Olympics.

References

1977 births
Living people
Biathletes at the 1998 Winter Olympics
Bulgarian female biathletes
Olympic biathletes of Bulgaria
Place of birth missing (living people)